Per Staffan Götestam (born 20 May 1952 in Örnsköldsvik, Sweden) is a Swedish actor, director, theatre chief, playwright and founder of Junibacken. He is best known as Jonatan in The Brothers Lionheart. He is brother to Birgitta Götestam. Götestam started playing amateur theatre with Örebro Student Theatre. He was educated at Skara skolscen and Statens scenskola, Stockholm. He played a role in the musical Godspell, in 1974.

Götestam wrote the music of the song "Mio My Mio" from the film Mio in the Land of Faraway. In the beginning of the 1980s, he started working with Olle Kinch, the theatre chief of Folkan. He then finished his acting career and became a producer/director. He directed many plays, among them Nils Karlsson Pyssling, Madicken and Tjorven på Saltkråkan, and many musicals, among them Rent, Beauty and the Beast and the Wizard of Oz. In 2000, Götestam received a Guldmasken.

Life 
Staffan Götestam went to theater school in 1973. After his theater training he got a role in the musical Godspell (1974), which was performed in the Jarlateatern in Stockholm

In 1977 he became known for his portrayal of Jonathan in the film The Brothers Lionheart. While working on this film, Götestam met Astrid Lindgren, with whom he would work a lot in the future. He adapted some of her works into theater plays and directed them. He also directed Astrid Lindgren's short films Gull-Pian and Nils Karlsson Pyssling.

In the late 1970s, Götestam began working mainly behind the scenes as a director, screenwriter or producer.

In 1996 he founded the Swedish museum Junibacken. The museum is dedicated to Astrid Lindgren's children's literature. The museum also deals with other famous figures such as Pettson and Findus. Götestam is still working at the museum in mid-2020.

Along with his daughter Josefine Götestam, he produced radio plays on well-known children's fairy tales such as Cinderella and The Little Mermaid.

In 2019 Götestam directed the play Happy Ending, for which he also wrote the screenplay.

Personal life 
Götestam is married and has four children. He lives in Östermalm.

Discography

Albums
1975 - Trollgas Adventskalender

Selected filmography
1990 - Nils Karlsson Pyssling (screenwriter, music writer and director)
1989 - Gull-Pian (director)
1986 - Bödeln och skökan
1977 - 91:an och generalernas fnatt
1977 - The Brothers Lionheart

References

Sources

 http://www.staffangotestam.se/

Living people
1952 births
People from Örnsköldsvik Municipality
Swedish male actors
20th-century Swedish dramatists and playwrights
Swedish theatre directors
Swedish male dramatists and playwrights
21st-century Swedish dramatists and playwrights